Raja Pratap Bahadur Singh (1889–1921) was a Somvanshi Rajput ruler of Pratapgarh State of Oudh, India.

See also 
 Pratapgarh (princely state)

References

People from Pratapgarh, Uttar Pradesh
20th-century Indian monarchs
1889 births
1921 deaths